TuRa Bergkamen is a German association football club from the city of Bergkamen, North Rhine-Westphalia.

History
The club was established in July 1945 out of the union of the former memberships of Turn- und Sport Bergkamen, Turnverein Bergkamen, and Arbeiter Turnverein Bergkamen, a group of onetime workers' clubs banned in 1933 under the Nazi regime as politically unpalatable left-leaning sides. The football department of the club later became independent as Fußball-Club TuRa Bergkamen.

Between 1948–62 the footballers were part of the Amateurliga Westfalen (II) capturing a divisional title there in 1954. Following the 1963 formation of the Bundesliga, the new national first division, and the Regionalliga (II), Bergkamen became part of lower division play. In 1965, they won their way back to what had become the third tier Amateurliga Westfalen, where they would spend three seasons before being sent down after a 15th-place result in 1968.

The current day club has departments for athletics, gymnastics, handball, judo, swimming, table tennis, and tennis. The footballers were part of Bezirksliga Staffel 8 (VIII) competition after promotion from the Kreisliga A Unna-Hamm (IX) in 2012 but relegated again in 2016.

References

External links
Official team site
Football department

Football clubs in Germany
Association football clubs established in 1945
1945 establishments in Germany
Football clubs in North Rhine-Westphalia